Anthony I, Count of Ligny (1450–1519) was the youngest son of Louis de Luxembourg, Count of Saint-Pol and his wife, Jeanne de Bar, Countess of Marle and Soissons.  In 1482, he inherited the County of Brienne from his brother  Peter II, Count of Saint-Pol.  After the death of Charles of Bourbon in 1510, Anthony inherited the County of Ligny, which thereby fell back to the House of Luxemburg.

Marriage and issue 
His name originates from the fact that he was an 8th generation descendant of Henry V, Count of Luxembourg, and thus belonged to the french branch of the House of Luxembourg.

He married three times:
 Antoinette (d. 1490), the daughter of Peter of Bauffremont and mother of:
 Philiberta, married in 1495 to John IV of Chalon-Arlay, Prince of Orange
 Françoise of Croÿ-Chimay, the daughter of Philip I of Croÿ-Chimay and mother of:
 Charles (1488–1530), his successor as Count of Ligny, through whose granddaughter Franziska of Luxemburg, famous descendants were produced which includes: Queen Mary of Great Britain, Alexander I and Nicholas I of Russia, Queen Anna Paulowna of the Netherlands from whom the current Dutch royal family is descended, German Emperor William II, Charles Napoléon, Elizabeth II of the United Kingdom, and Juan Carlos I of Spain.
 Gilette de Coétivy

By his mistress, Peronne de Machefert, he had an illegitimate son, Antoine of Luxembourg, Bastard of Brienne (1480-1538), who married and had issue (last male descendant John III of Chapelle died in 1670).

Counts of Ligny
House of Luxembourg
1450 births
1519 deaths
15th-century French people